Torre Sport Club, commonly known as Torre, was a Brazilian football club based in Recife, Pernambuco state. They won the Campeonato Pernambucano three times

History
The club was founded in 1909. They won the Campeonato Pernambucano in 1926, 1929, and in 1930. The club competed in the Campeonato Pernambucano for the last time in 1940. Torre eventually folded.

Achievements

 Campeonato Pernambucano:
 Winners (3): 1926, 1929, 1930

Stadium
Torre Sport Club played their home games at Estádio Avenida Malaquias. The stadium had a maximum capacity of 2,000 people.

References

Defunct football clubs in Pernambuco
Association football clubs established in 1915